Joghovourti Tsayn (meaning "Voice of the People") was an Armenian language weekly newspaper, issued as an organ of the Syrian–Lebanese Communist Party. The first issue appeared on February 6, 1938 in Beirut, Lebanon. It was the first Armenian-language organ of the party. Artin (Haroutiun) Madoyan was the editor of the newspaper. As of the 1950s, Ohannes Aghbashian (leader of the Armenian section of the Lebanese Communist Party) was the editor of Joghovourti Tsayn.

See also
Haratch (weekly)
Gantch

References

Armenian-language newspapers published in Lebanon
Communist newspapers
Defunct newspapers published in Lebanon
Defunct weekly newspapers
Newspapers published in Beirut
Newspapers established in 1938
Publications with year of disestablishment missing
Weekly newspapers published in Lebanon